Horta is a surname which may refer to:

 Adolfo Horta (1957–2016), Cuban boxer
 André Horta (born 1996), Portuguese footballer
 Carolina Horta (born 1992), Brazilian beach volleyball player
 Luís Horta (born 1952), Portuguese former footballer
 Oscar Horta (born 1974), Spanish animal activist and moral philosopher
 Ricardo Horta (born 1994), Portuguese footballer
 Silvio Horta (1974–2020), American screenwriter and television producer who developed and wrote for the television series Ugly Betty
 Victor Horta (1861–1947), Belgian architect who worked in the Art Nouveau style

See also 
 Salvador of Horta (1520–1567), 16th-century Spanish saint
 José Ramos-Horta (born 1949), East Timor politician

Portuguese-language surnames
Catalan-language surnames